Robert Jehle (13 July 1952 – 20 April 1988) was a Swiss handball player. He competed in the men's tournament at the 1980 Summer Olympics.

References

1952 births
1988 deaths
Swiss male handball players
Olympic handball players of Switzerland
Handball players at the 1980 Summer Olympics
Place of birth missing